The Communist Party of Spain (Marxist–Leninist) is an anti-revisionist Marxist-Leninist communist party in Spain, founded in 2006 by the Statewide Coordination of Communist Organizations (CEOC) and former PCE(ml) members.

PCE (m-l) publishes Octubre every month and is an active member of the International Conference of Marxist-Leninist Parties and Organizations (Unity & Struggle).

References

External links
PCE (m-l) website

2006 establishments in Spain
Communist parties in Spain
Anti-revisionist organizations
Stalinist parties
Hoxhaist parties
Far-left politics in Spain
International Conference of Marxist–Leninist Parties and Organizations (Unity & Struggle)
Political parties established in 2006